"Motor's Too Fast" is a single from Australian rock musician James Reyne. It was included on the international and Australian 1988 re-release of his debut self titled solo studio album. It was the fifth single taken from the album overall.

"Motor's Too Fast" provided Reyne a nomination for ARIA Award for Best Male Artist at the ARIA Music Awards of 1989. It lost to Barnestorming by Jimmy Barnes. The Chantoozies covered the song on their self-titled debut album but titled their cover "Slightest Notion".

Track listings
 CD Single/ 7”
 "Motor's Too Fast" - 3:34
 "Counting on Me" -

 Vinyl / 12" 
 A1	Motor's Too Fast	
 A2	Mr. Sandman  (Live)
 B1	Heaven On A Stick (Live)
 B2	Counting On Me (Live)

Charts

Weekly charts

Year-end chart

Credits
 Bass – Andy Cichon
 Drums – John Watson
 Guitar – Brett Kingman, Jef Scott
 Keyboards – Simon Hussey

External links

References

1988 songs
1988 singles
Capitol Records singles
James Reyne songs
Songs written by James Reyne
Songs written by Simon Hussey